In fiber optics, the mode field diameter (MFD) is a measure of the width of an irradiance distribution, i.e., the optical power per unit area, across the end face of a single-mode fiber. It is analogous to the  measure of the beam diameter for a beam propagating in free space.

For a Gaussian-shaped mode, the mode field diameter is twice the beam waist .

The MFD is typically slightly larger than the core of an optical fiber extending slightly into the cladding.

See also
 Beam diameter
 Gaussian beam

References

External links
 Mode Radius on the Encyclopedia of Laser Physics and Technology
 

Fiber optics